This is a list of seasons completed by the Atlanta Hawks of the National Basketball Association (NBA). In its 75-year history, the franchise has represented the cities of Buffalo, New York (1946), Moline, Illinois (1946–51), Milwaukee, Wisconsin (1951–55), St. Louis, Missouri (1955–68) and Atlanta, Georgia (since 1968). The club played its first three seasons in the National Basketball League (NBL), which merged with the Basketball Association of America in 1949, creating the NBA.

In 71 completed NBA seasons (1949–2020), the Hawks have compiled an all-time record of 2,921–3,059 (.488), including 2,164–2,282 (.487) in Atlanta.

Table key

Seasons

All-time records
Note: Statistics are correct as of the conclusion of the 2021–22 NBA season.

NBA records

NBL records

Notes

References

 
Seasons